Creusot may refer to
Le Creusot, town in France noted for its heavy industry
Communauté urbaine Creusot Montceau, region of France
155 mm Creusot Long Tom, an artillery piece 
Creusot steam hammer
10233 Le Creusot, an asteroid
Gare du Creusot TGV, railway station
Creusot Loire Mk F3 and Creusot Loire Mk 61, armoured vehicles
Schneider-Creusot, a historic steelworks and arms manufacturer based in Creusot

See also
Creuset (disambiguation)